Catriona McPherson (born October 22, 1965) is a Scottish writer. She is best known for her Dandy Gilver series. Her novels have won an Agatha Award (2012), two Macavity Awards (2012, 2015), seven Lefty Awards (2013), and two Anthony Awards (2014).

Biography 
McPherson was born October 22, 1965 in South Queensferry, Scotland and remained in Scotland until 2010 when she moved to California. 

She received a Master of Arts degree in English Language and Linguistics and Doctor of Philosophy in Linguistics, both from the University of Edinburgh.

Before committing herself to writing full-time in 2005, McPherson worked in banking, libraries, and academia.

Awards and honors

Publications

Standalone novels 

 As She Left It (2013)
 The Day She Died (2014)
 The Child Garden (2015)
 Come to Harm (2015)
 Quiet Neighbors (2016)
 House. Tree. Person. (2017)
 Go to My Grave (2018)
 Strangers at the Gate (2019)
 A Gingerbread House (2021)
 Quiet Neighbours (2021)
 In Place of Fear (2022)

Dandy Gilver series 

 After the Armistice Ball (2005)
 The Burry Man's Day (2006)
 Bury Her Deep (2007)
 The Winter Ground (2008)
 Dandy Gilver and the Proper Treatment of Bloodstains (2011)
 Dandy Gilver and an Unsuitable Day for a Murder (2012)
 Dandy Gilver and a Bothersome Number of Corpses (2012)
 Dandy Gilver & A Deadly Measure of Brimstone (2013)
 Dandy Gilver and The Reek of Red Herrings (2014)
 Dandy Gilver and the Unpleasantness in the Ballroom (2015)
 Dandy Gilver and a Most Misleading Habit (2016)
 Dandy Gilver and a Spot of Toil and Trouble (2017)
 A Step So Grave (2018)
 The Turning Tide (2019)
 The Mirror Dance (2021)

Last Ditch Mystery series 

 Scot Free (2018)
 Scot & Soda (2019)
 Scot on the Rocks (2021)
 Scot Mist (2022)
 Scot in a Trap (2022)

References

External links 
 Official website

1965 births
University of Edinburgh
21st-century Scottish women writers
Living people
People from South Queensferry
Alumni of the University of Edinburgh